Knife Fight is a 2012 American political thriller film starring Rob Lowe, Carrie-Anne Moss, Jamie Chung, Richard Schiff, Amanda Crew, Julie Bowen and Ryan Alosio. It is directed by Bill Guttentag and co-written by Bill Guttentag and former Al Gore spokesman Chris Lehane. The film was shot in San Francisco, California. The film premiered at the 2012 Tribeca Film Festival and was released theatrically in the United States on January 25, 2013 and was released on demand and digitally on January 28, 2013. Davey Havok of the band AFI makes an appearance.

Synopsis
A political strategist juggles three clients while facing the moral issues of his profession.

Cast

Reception
The film received negative reviews from critics. On Rotten Tomatoes, the film has an approval rating of 28%. On Metacritic, the film has a score of 34 out of 100, indicating "generally unfavorable reviews".

References

External links 
 
 
 
 

2012 films
Films directed by Bill Guttentag
American political thriller films
2010s English-language films
American political satire films
Films shot in San Francisco
Films about elections
2010s political thriller films
2010s American films